is a private university in Osaka, Japan. The predecessor of the school was founded in 1933. It was chartered as a junior women's college in 1951. In 2003 it became coeducational.

Faculties 
This university has the following faculties:

Faculty of Management
Department of Management
Department of Sports Management
Department of Global Tourism and Business

Faculty of Arts
 Department of Art and Design

Faculty of Education
 Department of Education

See also
 Osaka Seikei College
 Biwako Seikei Sport College

References

External links
 Official website 
 Website in English 

Educational institutions established in 1951
Private universities and colleges in Japan
Universities and colleges in Osaka
Higashiyodogawa-ku, Osaka
1951 establishments in Japan